

Group A

Head Coach:  Kevin Fallon

Head Coach:  John Ellinger

Head Coach:  Víctor Púa

Head Coach:  Michał Globisz

Group B

Head Coach:  Cecil Jones Attuquayefio

Head Coach:  Juan Santisteban

Head Coach:  José Luís Real Casillas

Head Coach:  Somchad Yimsiri

Group C

Head Coach:  Carlos César Ramos

Head Coach:  Les Scheinflug

Head Coach:  Fanyery Diarra

Head Coach:  Erich Rutemoeller

Group D

Head Coach:  Clovis de Oliveira

Head Coach:  Michel Jacques Yameogo

Head Coach:  Christobal Maldonado

Head Coach:  Saeed Al-Misnad

Fifa U-17 World Championship Squads, 1999
FIFA U-17 World Cup squads